The 2002 Tercera División play-offs to Segunda División B from Tercera División (Promotion play-offs) were the final playoffs for the promotion from 2001–02 Tercera División to 2002–03 Segunda División B. The first four teams of each group (excluding reserve teams) took part in the play-off.

Group A-1

Promoted to Segunda B: Ávila

Group A-2

Promoted to Segunda B: Avilés Ind.

Group A-3

Promoted to Segunda B: Ribadesella

Group A-4

Promoted to Segunda B: Langreo

Group B-1

Promoted to Segunda B: Noja

Group B-2

Promoted to Segunda B: Racing Sant. B

Group B-3

Promoted to Segunda B: Peña Sport

Group B-4

Promoted to Segunda B: Azkoyen

Group C-1

Promoted to Segunda B: Gavà

Group C-2

Promoted to Segunda B: Palamós

Group C-3

Promoted to Segunda B: Reus

Group C-4

Promoted to Segunda B: Orihuela
Levante B not promoted, Levante relegated to Segunda B.

Group D-1

Promoted to Segunda B: Cacereño

Group D-2

Promoted to Segunda B: Linares

Group D-3

Promoted to Segunda B: Torredonjimeno

Group D-4

Promoted to Segunda B: Moralo

Group E

Promoted to Segunda B: Corralejo

External links
Futbolme.com

2001-02
play
2002 Spanish football leagues play-offs